Eric Pollard may refer to:
 Eric Pollard, character on the British soap opera Emmerdale
 Eric Pollard (skier), American freeskier
 Eric Pollard, American musician who records as Actual Wolf